Theledectinae is an extinct subfamily of parareptiles within the family Procolophonidae. Theledectines existed in South Africa, China and Australia during the Early-Middle Triassic period (Induan to Anisian stages). Theledectinae was named by Juan Carlos Cisneros in 2008 to include the genus Theledectes, and the species "Eumetabolodon" dongshengensis. "E." dongshengensis represents a new genus from China. Cladistically, it is defined as "All taxa more closely related to Theledectes perforatus (Gow, 1977a) than to Procolophon trigoniceps Owen, 1876". In 2020, Hamley add the new genus Eomurruna from Australia to this subfamily

References

Procolophonids
Triassic parareptiles
Triassic reptiles of Africa
Triassic reptiles of Asia
Mesozoic reptiles of Australia